René Walschot (21 April 1916 – 16 June 2003) was a Belgian racing cyclist. He rode in the 1938 Tour de France.

References

1916 births
2003 deaths
Belgian male cyclists
Place of birth missing